"When a Woman Loves a Man" is a song written by Rafe Van Hoy and Mark Luna, and recorded by American country music singer Lee Roy Parnell with Trisha Yearwood providing harmony.  It was released in August 1995 as the second single from his album We All Get Lucky Sometimes.  The song spent 20 weeks on the Hot Country Songs charts, peaking at number 12 in 1996.

Music video
The music video was directed by Steven Goldmann and premiered in August 1995.

Chart performance
"When a Woman Loves a Man" debuted at number 67 on the U.S. Billboard Hot Country Singles & Tracks for the week of September 9, 1995.

References

1995 singles
1995 songs
Lee Roy Parnell songs
Song recordings produced by Scott Hendricks
Arista Nashville singles
Music videos directed by Steven Goldmann
Songs written by Rafe Van Hoy